Tribute to Bobby is a 2008 album by Simply Red frontman Mick Hucknall under the mononym 'Hucknall' and was his first solo album. It was released in the United Kingdom on 19 May 2008 and is a collection of songs in tribute to the blues singer Bobby Bland. The album charted at number 18 in the UK Official Albums Chart and spent two weeks inside the Top 75.

A DVD was also released along with the album. It contains a documentary which was filmed in Memphis, Tennessee in November 2007.

Track listing
 "Farther Up the Road" (Joe Medwick, Don Robey)  – 3:27
 "Ain't That Lovin' You" (Deadric Malone)  – 3:09
 "I'm Too Far Gone (To Turn Around)" (Belford Hendricks, Clyde Otis) – 2:15
 "Poverty" (Dave Clark, Pearl Woods)  – 3:19
 "Yolanda" (Daniel Moore)  – 3:56
 "Stormy Monday Blues" (Aaron "T-Bone" Walker) – 2:39
 "I Wouldn't Treat a Dog (The Way You Treated Me)" (Steve Barri, Michael Omartian, Michael Price, Dan Walsh) – 3:11
 "I'll Take Care of You" (Brook Benton) – 2:56
 "Chains of Love" (Ahmet Nugetre) – 2:59
 "I Pity the Fool" (Malone) – 3:36
 "Cry, Cry, Cry" (Malone) – 3:45
 "Lead Me On" (Malone) – 2:17

Personnel 
 Mick Hucknall – lead and backing vocals
 Andy Wright – bass, guitar, keyboards, piano, producer, programming, backing vocals
 David Clayton – clarinet, keyboards, Hammond organ, piano
 Gavin Goldberg – engineer, guitar, keyboards, mixing, producer, programming
 John "Snakehips" Johnson – trombone
 Ian Kirkham – saxophone
 Peter Lewinson – drums
 Steve Lewinson – bass, double bass
 Kenji Suzuki – guitar
 Jim McWilliam	– strings
 Kevin Robinson – trumpet
 Dave Bloor – engineer, programming
 Kevin Metcalfe – mastering
 Andy Scade – engineer
 John Stoddart – photography
 Johnny Wow – mixing

References

External links
 [ Tribute to Bobby] at Allmusic
 BBC Music review of Tribute to Bobby
 BellaOnline review
 Tribute to Bobby at MickHucknall.com

2008 debut albums
Tribute albums